Liang Xiaoyu (born 11 January 1996) is a Chinese-born Singaporean former badminton player. She is a one-time Olympian and a one-time national champion.

Early life 
Liang was born on 11 January 1996, in Nanjing, Jiangsu, China. She started playing badminton at a very young age under the influence of her father, a badminton trainer. She began to receive professional badminton training at the age of 7, and later became the champion of the Jiangsu's province junior team. Liang migrated to Singapore with his parents at the age of 10 and became a Singapore citizen in 2011. She became a member of the Singapore national badminton team in May 2011.

Career 
Liang is a former national champion, having won the women's singles title at the 2012 edition.

Liang was part of the mixed team that won a bronze medal at the 2014 Commonwealth Games in Glasgow. She represented Singapore at the 2014 Nanjing Youth Olympic Games, where she finished joint 9th in the singles and mixed event. She also clinched a women’s team bronze at the 2011, 2015 and 2017 Southeast Asian Games. She competed at the 2016 Summer Olympics.

On 26 August 2020, Liang announced on her social media that she had decided to retire from competitive badminton. She wrote, "I chose to retire due to injury. Thank you to my relatives and friends who have always supported me. Let's continue to work hard in the future!".

Awards 
Liang received the 2017 Meritorious Award from the Singapore National Olympic Committee.

Achievements

Asian Junior Championships 
Girls' singles

BWF Grand Prix 
The BWF Grand Prix had two levels, the Grand Prix and Grand Prix Gold. It was a series of badminton tournaments sanctioned by the Badminton World Federation (BWF) and played between 2007 and 2017.

Women's singles

  BWF Grand Prix Gold tournament
  BWF Grand Prix tournament

BWF International Challenge/Series 
Women's singles

  BWF International Challenge tournament
  BWF International Series tournament

References

External links
 
 
 
 

Living people
1996 births
Sportspeople from Nanjing
Badminton players from Jiangsu
Chinese emigrants to Singapore
Singaporean sportspeople of Chinese descent
Naturalised citizens of Singapore
Chinese female badminton players
Singaporean female badminton players
Singapore Sports School alumni
Badminton players at the 2014 Summer Youth Olympics
Badminton players at the 2016 Summer Olympics
Olympic badminton players of Singapore
Badminton players at the 2014 Commonwealth Games
Commonwealth Games bronze medallists for Singapore
Commonwealth Games medallists in badminton
Competitors at the 2011 Southeast Asian Games
Competitors at the 2015 Southeast Asian Games
Competitors at the 2017 Southeast Asian Games
Southeast Asian Games bronze medalists for Singapore
Southeast Asian Games medalists in badminton
Medallists at the 2014 Commonwealth Games